Marcel Willemsen (born 28 May 1977 in Lochem, Gelderland) is a Dutch sidecarcross passenger and 1999 World Champion.

Marcel won the 1999 world championship as the passenger for his older brother, the seven times world champion Daniël Willemsen. After this, he left his brothers team and started racing as a sidecarcross driver himself, competing in the Dutch and the world championship.

Willemsen is married and has three children, living in Lochem. In 2007 he announced that 2008 would be his last season as a GP rider, retiring from the international competition but took part in a limited number of races in the following seasons and raced a full season again in 2012.

Sidecarcross world championship results

Marcel started racing with his brother Daniël in the world championship in 1995. As a passenger, his first world championship race was the Dutch GP in Markelo on 24 September 1995, which is the only one he raced in that season. The two brothers quickly improved and the next season saw their first win, at the French GP in Baugé on 12 May 1996. From season to season they improved, culminating in a one-point win of the world championship in 1999. Marcel suffered serious injuries in a training run in February 2000, finding himself temporarily paralysed and unable to continue racing.

He made a surprising recovery within ten months and returned to the sidecarcross world championship in 2001, now as a driver, with his countryman Rene Boon as passenger. Marcel could however not achieve the same success there as he had with his brother, a tenth overall finish in 2006 being his strongest season result. Three fifth place finishes in races were his best results in individual events. The 2008 season, now with his German passenger Marco Godau, was to be his last as an international rider, but he may continue to race in the Dutch championship were his showings have been much stronger over the years. He did take part in the Dutch and Swiss GP with passenger Bruno Kaelin in 2009, achieving good results.

He mainly raced in the 2009 German Championship, where he finished second overall. In 2010, Willemsen participated in three Grand Prix once more, again with Bruno Kaelin as his passenger. In 2011, he took part in twelve races, using Gertie Eggink as his passenger, who had won the world championship in the previous year as passenger of Marcel's brother. With the same passenger in 2012, Willemsen finished in eighth place in the world championship, earning his first-ever podium finish as a driver at the first race of the 2012 Belgian GP.

In the 2013 season he only took part in one event of the GP season, the first race of the Belgian GP, where he and his passenger Gertie Eggink came eleventh. The pair raced in five events in 2014 and came 20th overall, a result repeated in 2015.

Season by season

Source:

Source:

 Passengers in italics.

Honours

World Championship
 Champions: (1) 1999
 Runners-up: (1) 1998

Netherlands
 Champions: (2) 1998, 1999
 Runners-up: (1) 1997

References

External links
 Marcel Willemsens official website (in Dutch)
 The World Championship on Sidecarcross.com

1977 births
Living people
People from Lochem
Dutch sidecarcross riders
Sportspeople from Gelderland